The 2019–20 Florida Gulf Coast Eagles women's basketball team represented Florida Gulf Coast University during the 2019–20 NCAA Division I women's basketball season. The Eagles, led by eighteenth year head coach Karl Smesko, played their home games at the Alico Arena and were members of the Atlantic Sun Conference.  They finished the season 30–3, 15–1 in A-Sun play to win the Atlantic Sun regular season.

Florida Gulf Coast was scheduled to play in the conference tournament championship game versus Liberty, but it was canceled due to the COVID-19 pandemic.  Post-season play ended there as the NCAA women's basketball tournament and WNIT were all cancelled before they began due to the pandemic.

Roster

Schedule

|-
!colspan=12 style=| Non-conference regular season

|-
!colspan=12 style=| Atlantic Sun Conference regular season

|-
!colspan=12 style=| Atlantic Sun Tournament

Source

Rankings

Coaches did not release a Week 2 poll and AP does not release a final poll.

See also
 2019–20 Florida Gulf Coast Eagles men's basketball team

References

Florida Gulf Coast
Florida Gulf Coast Eagles women's basketball seasons
Florida Gulf Coast Eagles women's basketball
Florida Gulf Coast Eagles women's basketball